2018 Budha Subba Gold Cup (Nepali: बुढासुब्बा गोल्डकप २०७५) is a football tournament of Nepali Football. This is the 20th session of Budha Subba Gold Cup. Three Star Club won this football tournament against Nepal Police Club.

Matches

Semi-final

Final

References

Budha Subba Gold Cup
Football in Nepal